Tasha Humphrey (born December 29, 1985) is an American professional basketball player. She played the center position for the Washington Mystics in the WNBA until being waived 6 July 2009. Her father was former Green Bay Packers player Donnie Humphrey.

College career
Born in Gainesville, Georgia, Humphrey completed her career as Georgia's second all-time scorer and fourth all-time rebounder. Humphrey scored her 1,000th point in just 53 games, the second fastest in school history.

Humphrey played for the USA team in the 2007 Pan American Games in Rio de Janeiro, Brazil. The team won all five games, earning the gold medal for the event.

Georgia statistics
Source

WNBA career
Humphrey was selected in the first round of the 2008 WNBA Draft (11th overall) by the Detroit Shock. Halfway through her rookie season, Humphrey was traded to the Washington Mystics for veteran Taj McWilliams-Franklin. In Washington, Humphrey could take on a more prominent role than she had in Detroit.
 
She finished her rookie season starting 23 of the 30 games she played in. She averaged 17 minutes, 3.1 rebounds, and 8.3 points per game. One of Humphrey's strengths is her ability to stretch the defense, making her a valuable center. In her rookie season, she ranked 13th in the league in three point field goal percentage (.382, 26–68).

Her career high is 28 points.

WNBA career statistics

Regular season

|-
| align="left" | 2008
| align="left" | Detroit
| 22 || 16 || 13.5 || .500 || .385 || .955 || 2.9 || 1.0 || 0.6 || 0.3 || 1.1 || 7.3
|-
| align="left" | 2008
| align="left" | Washington
| 8 || 7 || 26.5 || .415 || .379 || .588 || 6.1 || 1.1 || 0.5 || 0.3 || 2.6 || 11.1
|-
| align="left" | 2009
| align="left" | Washington
| 9 || 0 || 7.4 || .250 || .250 || .600 || 1.4 || 0.3 || 0.1 || 0.3 || 0.7 || 2.2
|-
| align="left" | 2009
| align="left" | Minnesota
| 19 || 4 || 17.9 || .399 || .322 || .808 || 3.1 || 0.4 || 0.6 || 0.3 || 0.7 || 7.9
|-
| align="left" | Career
| align="left" | 2 years, 3 teams
| 58 || 27 || 15.8 || .425 || .345 || .786 || 3.2 || 0.7 || 0.5 || 0.3 || 1.1 || 7.2

References

External links
WNBA Player File

1985 births
Living people
All-American college women's basketball players
American women's basketball players
Basketball players at the 2007 Pan American Games
Basketball players from Georgia (U.S. state)
Centers (basketball)
Detroit Shock players
Georgia Lady Bulldogs basketball players
Minnesota Lynx players
Pan American Games gold medalists for the United States
Pan American Games medalists in basketball
People from Gainesville, Georgia
Sportspeople from the Atlanta metropolitan area
Washington Mystics players
Medalists at the 2007 Pan American Games
United States women's national basketball team players